The 1944–45 Southern Football League was the fifth edition of the regional war-time football league tournament.

Table

References

season
1
Scot